Twenty-Four Hours in the Life of a Woman is a 1927 novella by the Austrian writer Stefan Zweig. It was filmed in 1931, 1944, 1952, 1968, and 2002. A television movie was telecast in 1961 starring Ingrid Bergman and Rip Torn.

Plot
"It traces a woman through a single day, but that day is simultaneously the most vividly wonderful and ultimately terrible of her life. She is an English widow who becomes mesmerised by the almost suicidally reckless gambling of a failed Polish diplomat one evening in Monte Carlo. From this first spark of interest, she is drawn into his troubled, unstable life."

See also
 1927 in literature
 Austrian literature

References

1927 German-language novels
Austrian novels
German-language novels
Austrian novels adapted into films
Novellas by Stefan Zweig